A quadrangular castle or courtyard castle is a type of castle characterised by ranges of buildings which are integral with the curtain walls, enclosing a central ward or quadrangle, and typically with angle towers. There is no keep and frequently no distinct gatehouse. The quadrangular form predominantly dates from the mid to late fourteenth century and signals the transition from defensively to domestically oriented great houses. The four walls are also known as ranges.

Quadrangular castles typically display a sophisticated and complex approach to the planning of internal social spaces. There are many quadrangular castles around the UK, for example: Bodiam Castle in East Sussex, and Bolton Castle.

The 27 quadrangular castles identified by John Rickard as being  built in England consist roughly 10% of the castles built in the country between 1272 and 1422. No castles of this design were built in Wales.

One of the earliest quadrangular castles in Germany is Neuleiningen, of which substantial ruins remain.

List of quadrangular castles in the United Kingdom

References

Fortifications by type
Castles by type